Lowness may refer to:

 Sharon Lowness, Canadian musician; see Boot Records
 The noun form of Low (complexity), a relationship between complexity classes in computational complexity theory
 Prince Lowness, a character in the Terrific Whatzit DC Comics stories
 A song by Patrice Rushen from the 1990 album The Meeting

See also
 Low (disambiguation)
 Lownes (disambiguation)
 Meanness
 Pitch (music)